The 1972–73 Yugoslav First Basketball League season was the 29th season of the Yugoslav First Basketball League, the highest professional basketball league in SFR Yugoslavia.

Classification 

The winning roster of Radnički Belgrade:
  Dragan Ivković
  Dragan Vučinić
  Dušan Trivalić
  Dragoljub Zmijanac
  Jovica Veljović
  Dragoslav Ražnatović
  Miroslav Ðordević
  Milun Marović
  Miroljub Damjanović
  Srećko Jarić
  Radovan Novović
  Milovan Tasić
  Dušan Zupančić
  Nikola Bjegović
  Slobodan Zimonjić

Coach:  Slobodan Ivković

Scoring leaders
 Damir Šolman (Jugoplastika) - ___ points (31.0ppg)

Qualification in 1973-74 season European competitions 

FIBA European Champions Cup
 Radnički Belgrade (champions)

FIBA Cup Winner's Cup
 Crvena Zvezda (Cup winners)

FIBA Korać Cup
 Partizan (3rd)
 Borac Čačak (4th)
 Olimpija (5th)
 Jugoplastika (6th)

References

Yugoslav First Basketball League seasons
Yugo
Yugo